Per Skaarup (born July 6, 1955) is a former Danish handball player who competed in the 1980 Summer Olympics and in the 1984 Summer Olympics.

He was born in Frederiksberg.

In 1980 he was part of the Danish team which finished ninth in the Olympic tournament. He played all six matches and scored four goals.

Four years later he finished fourth with the Danish team in the 1984 Olympic tournament. He played all six matches and scored seven goals.

External links
 profile

1955 births
Living people
Danish male handball players
Olympic handball players of Denmark
Handball players at the 1980 Summer Olympics
Handball players at the 1984 Summer Olympics
Sportspeople from Frederiksberg